"Bad Vibes Forever" (stylized as bad vibes forever) is a song by American rapper XXXTentacion featuring fellow American rappers PnB Rock and Trippie Redd. It was released on November 22, 2019, as the third single from XXXTentacion's fourth and final studio album of the same name. The song was produced by John Cunningham.

Charts

References 

2019 singles
2019 songs
Empire Distribution singles
XXXTentacion songs
PnB Rock songs
Trippie Redd songs
Songs released posthumously
Songs written by XXXTentacion
Songs written by Trippie Redd
Songs written by PnB Rock